Cleon was an Athenian statesman.

Cleon may also refer to:

Single name
Cleon (general) (died 132 BC), general in First Servile War
 Cleon (sculptor), ancient Greek sculptor from Sicyon
 Cleon of Sicyon, a tyrant of the ancient Greek city of Sicyon
 Cleon of Gordiucome, king in Asia Minor
Fictional characters
 Cleon I and Cleon II, fictional emperors in Isaac Asimov's Foundation series of novels
 Cleon, a character in The Warriors
 Cleon King Cleon of Astopor ("Cleon the Great", "The Butcher King"), a fictional king in George R. R. Martin's fantasy series, A Song of Ice and Fire
 Cleon, pen name used by American illustrator Cleo Damianakes in 1920s book dust jacket designs

Places
 Cléon, a commune in France
 Cléon-d'Andran, a commune in France
 Cleon Township, Michigan

Other uses
 Renault Cléon engine

Given name
 Cleon Daskalakis (born 1962), American hockey player
 Cleon H. Foust (1907–2003), American politician from Indiana
 Cleon Jones (born 1942), American baseball player
 Cleon Lacefield, American manager for NASA and Lockheed Martin
 W. Cleon Skousen (1913–2006), American conservative author and academic
 Cleon Turner (born 1945), American politician and Massachusetts state legislator